The OMEGA Tag Team Championship is the top tag team title in the Organization of Modern Extreme Grappling Arts independent professional wrestling promotion.

Title history

Combined reigns 

By team

By Wrestler

References

External links
 Omega Tag Team Championship

OMEGA Championship Wrestling championships
Tag team wrestling championships